Julie Cypher (born August 24, 1964) is an American film director best known for being the former partner of musician Melissa Etheridge and former spouse of Lou Diamond Phillips.

Biography
Cypher was born in Wichita, Kansas, to Dick and Betty ( Jackson) Cypher, and has an older sister named Melanie. She attended the University of Texas at Austin studying television and film.

She married actor Lou Diamond Phillips on September 17, 1987. Two years later, she met Etheridge while assisting on the music video for the single "Bring Me Some Water", and split with Phillips in 1990 to start a relationship with Etheridge. Cypher directed the 1995 film Teresa's Tattoo, starring Phillips, C. Thomas Howell, and Kiefer Sutherland.

Personal life
After originally spending roughly three years in a marriage with Lou Diamond Phillips, Cypher was a gay rights advocate, and became famous for being one half of one of the first publicly lesbian celebrity couples. In 1995 she and Etheridge appeared in a "We'd Rather Go Naked Than Wear Fur" poster campaign for PETA.

During her partnership with Etheridge, Cypher gave birth to two children via artificial insemination: a daughter, Bailey Jean, born in February 1997, and a son, Beckett, born November 1998. Although initially reluctant to discuss it, the couple eventually revealed that the biological father of both children was musician David Crosby. In a 1999 therapy session, Cypher told Etheridge that she (Cypher) was "not gay", and the couple split in September 2000. Cypher went on to marry Matthew Hale in 2004.

On May 13, 2020, Etheridge announced via Twitter that their son, Beckett, died at age 21.

References

External links

1964 births
Living people
Bisexual women
American LGBT rights activists
LGBT people from Kansas
LGBT film directors
People from Wichita, Kansas
Moody College of Communication alumni
American women film directors
21st-century American women